The following is a list of stadiums in Taiwan, ordered by capacity. Currently all stadiums with a capacity of 5,000 or more are included.

See also
List of sporting events in Taiwan
Sport in Taiwan
List of Asian stadiums by capacity

Taiwan
Stadiums